Lille Strandstræde 18 os a Neoclassical property situated off Sankt Annæ Plads in central Copenhagen, Denmark. It was listed in the Danish registry of protected buildingsand places om 1950-

History

18th century

The site was formerly part of a much larger property, listed in Copenhagen's first cadastre of 1689 as NNo. 26 in St. Ann's East Quarter. It was owned by Jens Broch at that time. This property was later divided into a number of smaller properties. The property now known as Lille Strandstræde 18 was listed in the new cadastre of 1756 as No. 98 and belonged to brewer Iver Christian Qvist at that time.

Peter Andreas Valentin
The property was home to 16 residents in two households at the time of the 1898 census. Peter Andreas Valentin, a brewer and grocer (hørkræmmer) resided in the building with his wife Anna Rebekka Bringe, their two children (aged two and five), three employees and one maid. Hans Jacob Hiorth, a judge in Hof- og Stadsretten, resided in the building with his wife Helena, two daughters (aged 10 and 22), one male servant, one female cook and one maid.

Vanentin's property was home to a total of 30 residents at the 1801 census. Valentin now with title of Regiment Quarter Master, resided in the building with his wife, their now four children (aged three to 19), a brewer, a brewer's assistant, a caretaker and a maid. Adam Christopher Knuth, a chamberlain, resided in the building with his wife Sophie Magdalene Knuth, their six children (aged four to 17), a male instructor, a female French teacher (Francoise=, two chamber maids (kammerjomfru and jomfru), a housekeeper, a male servant and a maid.

The property was listed in the new cadastre of 1806 as No. 66 in St. Ann's East Quarter. It was still owned by regiment quarter master and  Peter AndreasValentin at that time.

Heyman and the new building
 

The present building on the site was constructed in 1833-34 for merchant Wulff Philip Heyman (1794–1866) and Sophie Abrahamson. The large property No. 66 was in 1852 divided into the two separate properties No. 55 A (now Lille Strandstræde 18) and No. 66 B (now Nyhavn 31).

The large complex of buildings was home to a total of 126 residents at the time of the 1840 census. The number of residents had by 1845 declined to 96.

In 1852 a section of the property was transferred to No. 68 B (Nyhavn 31, then No. 66 B & 68 B).

The writer Arthur Abrahams (1836-1905) resided on the first floor from 1891 until his death.

Architecture
The building is in four storeys over a raised cellar. The front is five bays wide and rendered in a pale grey colour. It is finished by a Meander frieze under the windows on the first floor and a dentillated cornice under the roof. The gateway furthest to the right (south) is topped by a transom window and next to it is an old cast iron sign from a klein smith. In the third bay is a cellar entrance topped by a Neoclassical hood mould supported by corbels.

A six-bay perpendicular side wing extends from the rear side of the building. It is again attached to a number of other secondary buildings, surrounding a narrow, cobbled courtyard. All the facades are plastered in an iron vitriol yellow colour. The building (including the six-bay side wing) was listed in the Danish registry of protected buildings and places in 1950. The other buildings in the courtyard are not part of the heritage listing.

Today
The property is today owned by the cooperative housing association (andelsboligforening) A/B Lllle Strandstræde 18.

References

External links

Listed residential buildings in Copenhagen
Neoclassical architecture in Copenhagen
Residential buildings completed in 1834
1834 establishments in Denmark